Bruce Hampton (born Gustav Valentine Berglund III; April 30, 1947 – May 1, 2017) was an American musician.  He was a key figure in the Atlanta, Georgia music scene, mentoring numerous other musicians who became national stars.  His own musical style was avant-garde, combining elements of jazz, fusion, southern rock and jam band styles.

He first rose to prominence as the leader of the Hampton Grease Band. Adopting the moniker Colonel Hampton B. Coles, Retired or alternatively Col. Bruce Hampton Ret., and sometimes playing a sort of dwarf guitar called a "chazoid", he later formed several other bands, some of whose names include The Late Bronze Age, The Aquarium Rescue Unit, The Fiji Mariners, The Codetalkers, The Quark Alliance, Pharaoh Gummitt, and Madrid Express.

Career
As a member of the Hampton Grease Band, Bruce Hampton helped record the 1971 album Music to Eat. According to legend, this was the second-worst-selling album in Columbia Records history, with the worst being a yoga record.

Hampton's band The Late Bronze Age consisted of "Col. Hampton B. Coles, Ret." (Bruce Hampton) on vocals, slide guitar, mandolin, and chazoid; Ben "Pops" Thornton (Billy McPherson) on vocals, guitar, saxophones, and keyboards; Lincoln Metcalfe (Ricky Keller) on bass, guitar, brass, and vocals; and Bubba Phreon (Jerry Fields) on drums, percussion, trombone, and vocals. They performed several songs in the 1983 movie Getting It On.

Hampton helped start the 1990s seminal H.O.R.D.E. tours. The best known of his bands to play H.O.R.D.E. is the jazz-rock outfit Aquarium Rescue Unit, which featured improvisational music all-stars Oteil Burbridge, Jimmy Herring, Rev. Jeff Mosier, Matt Mundy, and Jeff Sipe.

In 1994, Hampton then formed the progressive rock/jazz duo Fiji Mariners and recorded two albums on Capricorn Records with Dan Matrazzo who simultaneously played keys, drums, and bass.  Later, Ricky Fargo, Marcus Williams joined on drums and Joseph Patrick Moore joined on bass.

Hampton was the voice of Warren, a talking potted shrub, in a 1998 episode ("Warren") of the TV show Space Ghost Coast to Coast. Hampton played Morris, the songwriting band manager, in Billy Bob Thornton's 1996 film Sling Blade. He also starred in Mike Gordon's 2001 film Outside Out as a guitar 'out'structor.

Grammy Award nominated blues singer and longtime friend Susan Tedeschi wrote a song about Bruce called "Hampmotized." It appears on her 2002 release Wait For Me. Hampton returned the favor with the song "Susan T".

Basically Frightened: The Musical Madness of Col. Bruce Hampton, Ret. is a documentary about Hampton. It premiered at the Atlanta Film Festival in March 2012.

Georgia Governor Nathan Deal presented Hampton with the Governor's Award In The Arts and Humanities in 2012.

In 2014, Hampton made a cameo in the music video for rap group Run The Jewels' single "Blockbuster Night, Pt. 1".

2015 saw the production of Here Comes Rusty in which Hampton portrayed the lead character, Dicky, alongside co-stars Fred Willard, Joey Lauren Adams and Brandon Niederauer. The film debuted at the Atlanta Film Festival in 2016, but was not commercially available until 2020.

70th birthday concert and death
On May 1, 2017, Hampton was honored by his friends at the Fox Theatre in Atlanta, Georgia for his 70th birthday. Dubbed Hampton 70: A Celebration of Col. Bruce Hampton, it was an all-star concert featuring Widespread Panic members John Bell, Dave Schools, Duane Trucks, and Jimmy Herring; blues guitarist Tinsley Ellis; Peter Buck of R.E.M; steel guitarist Darick Campbell; saxophone player Karl Denson; Drew Emmitt and Vince Herman of Leftover Salmon; Jon Fishman of Phish; banjo player Rev. Jeff Mosier of Blueground Undergrass; guitarist Warren Haynes; Drivin N Cryin frontman Kevn Kinney; Atlanta jazz-staple Johnny Knapp; Chuck Leavell; Athens rock-troubadour T. Hardy Morris; 13-year-old guitar prodigy Brandon Niederauer; slide guitarist Derek Trucks and blues singer Susan Tedeschi of the Tedeschi Trucks Band; John Popper of Blues Traveler; funk bassist Kevin Scott; keyboardist Matt Slocum; Denny Walley of Frank Zappa fame; gypsy-metal guitarist Emil Werstler; Oliver Wood of The Wood Brothers; and MLB pitcher Jake Peavy. Billy Bob Thornton was scheduled to appear but was not in attendance.  The event was produced by Good Times Productions with the proceeds benefiting the Fox Theatre Institute and other musician-focused charities.

During the encore performance of the show, Hampton suffered a massive heart attack and collapsed on stage. Onlookers and his fellow musicians initially either did not notice that Hampton had collapsed, or thought it was a ruse due to his history of falling down onstage during performances and other practical jokes. As a result, Hampton lay face down at Niederauer's feet, his left arm draped over a stage monitor, as Niederauer soloed on "Turn On Your Love Light". The band played for several minutes before Hampton was taken offstage; he died shortly thereafter at Emory University Hospital Midtown in Atlanta, Georgia.

Discography

Main releases

 1971 – Music to Eat – Hampton Grease Band (Columbia Records)
 1978 – One Ruined Life of a Bronze Tourist – Col. Bruce Hampton (Pine Tree Records)
 1980 – Outside Looking Out – Col. Bruce Hampton and the Late Bronze Age (Landslide Records)
 1982 – Isles of Langerhan – Col. Bruce Hampton and the Late Bronze Age (Landslide Records)
 1987 – Arkansas – Col. Bruce Hampton (Landslide Records)
 1992 – Col. Bruce Hampton & the Aquarium Rescue Unit – Col. Bruce Hampton and the Aquarium Rescue Unit (Capricorn Records)
 1993 – Mirrors of Embarrassment – Col. Bruce Hampton and the Aquarium Rescue Unit (Capricorn Records)
 1994 – Strange Voices: A History 1977–1987 – Col. Bruce Hampton (Landslide Records)
 1996 – Fiji Mariners – Fiji Mariners featuring Col. Bruce Hampton (Capricorn Records)
 1998 – Live – Fiji Mariners featuring Col. Bruce Hampton (Capricorn Records)
 2000 – Bootleg Live! – The Codetalkers featuring Col. Bruce Hampton
 2004 – Deluxe Edition – The Codetalkers featuring Col. Bruce Hampton (re-released in 2005 as Dee-lux Uh-dish-un)
 2006 – Now – The Codetalkers
 2007 – Give Thanks to Chank – Col. Bruce & The Quark Alliance (Brato Ganibe Records)
 2008 – Songs Of The Solar Ping – Col. Bruce Hampton, Ret. (Brato Ganibe Records)
 2014 – Pharoah's Kitchen – Col. Bruce Hampton, Ret. (Ropeadope Records)
 2017 – Live at The Vista Room – Col. Bruce Hampton and The Madrid Express (Ropeadope Records)

With various artists
 1994 – The Best of Mountain Stage Live, Vol. 6 (Blue Plate Records)
 1997 – Mucho Mojo: Best of Fat Possum (Capricorn Records)
 2000 – Wintertime Blues: The Benefit Concert (Evil Teen Records)
 2003 – Bonnaroo, Vol. 2 (Sanctuary Records)
 2007 – The Benefit Concert, Volume 2 (Evil Teen Records)

As a guest musician
 1967 – We're Only In It For The Money – Frank Zappa (Verve Records)
 1968 – Lumpy Gravy – Frank Zappa (briefly released under Capitol Records)
 1979 – Skin Deep – Yeah – David Earle Johnson (David Earle Johnson Records)
 1981 – Route Two – David Earle Johnson (Landslide Records)
 1995 – The Best of CeDell Davis – CeDell Davis (Fat Possum Records)
 2000 – The Flower & the Knife – Kevn Kinney (Capricorn Records)
 2001 – Project Z – Project Z (Terminus Records)
 2002 – Wait for me – Susan Tedeschi (Tone Cool Records)
 2002 – Uninvisible – Medeski Martin & Wood (Blue Note Records)
 2002 – Live in the Classic City – Widespread Panic (Sanctuary Records)
 2003 – Inside In – Mike Gordon (Ropeadope Records)
 2006 – Faces – Blueground Undergrass (Landslide Records)
 2009 - Sold Out - Big Shanty (King Mojo Records)
 2012 – Back To The Woods: A Tribute To The Pioneers Of Blues Piano – Chuck Leavell (Evergreen Arts \ Red)
 2012 – Wood – Widespread Panic (Widespread Records)
2015 – Soul Brother Where Art Thou? - Greg Hester (Ropeadope Records)

References

External links
 Official website
The Colonel sits down with Ira Haberman of The Sound Podcast for a feature interview

1947 births
2017 deaths
Musicians from Atlanta
Musicians from Knoxville, Tennessee
American pop musicians
Capricorn Records artists
Guitarists from Georgia (U.S. state)
Guitarists from Tennessee
American male guitarists
Musicians who died on stage
20th-century American guitarists
20th-century American male musicians
Col. Bruce Hampton and the Aquarium Rescue Unit members
The Quark Alliance members